The Bill Evans Trio "Live" is a live album by American jazz pianist Bill Evans and his Trio, released in 1971 and recorded in 1964. Additional tracks have been released in 1997 on "The Complete Bill Evans on Verve" box set.

Track listing
Side 1
 "Nardis" (Miles Davis) - 6:00
 "Some Day My Prince Will Come" (Frank Churchill, Larry Morey) - 6:20
 "Stella by Starlight" (Ned Washington, Victor Young) - 6:20
 "How My Heart Sings" (Earl Zindars) - 4:45
Side 2
 "'Round Midnight" (Thelonious Monk, Cootie Williams) - 6:06
 "What Kind of Fool Am I?" (Leslie Bricusse, Anthony Newley) - 8:00
 "The Boy Next Door" (Ralph Blane, Hugh Martin) - 5:50
 "How Deep Is the Ocean?" (Irving Berlin) - 5:24

Personnel
Bill Evans – piano
Larry Bunker – drums
Chuck Israels – bass

References

External links
The Bill Evans Memorial Library

Bill Evans live albums
1964 live albums
Verve Records live albums
Albums produced by Creed Taylor